Kreek is an Estonian surname (meaning  "damson") and Dutch surname (meaning  "creek" or "stream"), with notable bearers including: 

 Adam Kreek (born 1980), Canadian rower
 Aleksander Kreek (1914–1977), Estonian shot putter and discus thrower
 Ardo Kreek (born 1986), Estonian volleyball player
 Cyrillus Kreek (1889–1962), Estonian composer
 Mary Jeanne Kreek (1937–2021), American neurobiologist
 Michel Kreek (born 1971), Dutch footballer

See also
 Creek (disambiguation)

Estonian-language surnames
Dutch-language surnames